Basatabad may refer to:

Basatabad, Delfan
Basatabad, Selseleh